The Liber Usualis is a book of commonly used Gregorian chants in the Catholic tradition, compiled by the monks of the Abbey of Solesmes in France. According to Willi Apel, the chants in the Liber Usualis originated in the 11th century.

This 1,900-page book contains most versions of the ordinary chants for the Mass (Kyrie, Gloria, Credo, Sanctus, and Agnus Dei), as well as the common chants for the Divine Office (daily prayers of the Church) and for every commonly celebrated feast of the Church year—including more than two hundred pages for Holy Week alone—as practiced prior to the 1969 liturgical reforms of Pope Paul VI. The "usual book" or "common book" also contains chants for specific rituals, such as nuptial Masses, Requiem Masses and the Office of the Dead, ordinations, and Benediction. This modal, monophonic Latin music has been sung in the Catholic Church since at least the sixth century to the present day. An extensive introduction explains how to read and interpret the medieval musical notation (square notation of neums or neumes). A complete index makes it easy to find specific pieces.

The Liber was first edited in 1896 by Solesmes Abbot Dom André Mocquereau (1849–1930). Its use has decreased since the Second Vatican Ecumenical Council (opened by Pope John XXIII in 1962), in the constitution on the liturgy (Sacrosanctum Concilium), allowed the local language to be used in Church rites, even though the same council mandated that Gregorian chant should retain "pride of place" in the liturgy (Sacrosanctum Concilium, 116).

Bibliography and external links 

 Solesmes Abbey
 Liber Usualis (1924, Modern notation with a five line staff, publisher number 780c) in PDF format
 Liber Usualis (1961, Solesmes notation with a four line staff) in PDF format (115 MB)
 Bergeron, Katherine. Decadent enchantments: the revival of Gregorian chant at Solesmes. Berkeley: University of California Press, c1998.  .
 Nova Organi Harmonia (a nearly complete organ accompaniment to the Liber Usualis)

References

Catholic liturgical music
Roman Rite liturgical books